Paul Philippe Hardouin de Beaumont de Péréfixe (1606 – 1 January 1671, Paris) was a French historian and clergyman. He was bishop of Rodez, then archbishop of Paris.

Biography

Born at Beaumont, Vienne into a family of Neapolitan origin, he was the son of a maître d'hotel to Richelieu. he studied at the University of Poitiers and Paris where he received a doctorate at the Sorbonne. In 1644 he became preceptor to Louis XIV, who also made him his confessor. After being Abbot of Saint-Michel-en-l'Herm, he was appointed Bishop of Rodez in 1649 and he was elected member of the Académie française in 1654. In 1662, Louis XIV appointed him Archbishop of Paris, headmaster of Sorbonne, and commander of the Order of the Holy Spirit.

Engaged in the fight against Jansenism, Monseigneur de Beaumont de Perefixe published in 1664 an order "for the signature of the form of faith, drawn up in execution of the Constitutions of our Holy Fathers Popes Innocent X and Alexander VII" which aimed to compel the nuns of Port-Royal des Champs to sign a form condemning the Jansenist theses. He travelled several times to Port-Royal, deprived the recalcitrant of the sacraments, then ordered their captivity. The affair ended in 1669 with a new ordinance "in favor of the nuns of Port-Royal des Champs" which forced them to submit. Henry de Montherlant brilliantly staged all the protagonists of this struggle in his play, Port-Royal.

As his reputation of intransigence seemed firmly established - it is he who prohibited the Tartuffe Molière the day after his first public performance at the Palais Royal Theater in 1667 - as Hardouin Perefixe continued to enjoy all his life in the favor of Louis XIV. After having composed for the young king a collection of Latin maxims in 1647, he wrote for him a History of King Henry the Great which appeared in 1661. The book was very widely published and is translated into many languages.

Voltaire made some praiseworthy comments on this book: "Perefixe moves all sensible hearts, and has the memory of that prince, whose weaknesses were only those of a kind man, and whose virtues were those of a great man."

For Sainte-Beuve, Hardouin de Perefixe was "a rather agreeable writer in his" Life of Henry the Great, "rather learned, rather good-natured, but without character, without elevation of soul, or any exterior dignity; he was never at the height of his high position, and in more than one case incurred ridicule."

References

External links
 
Biography at the Académie française site

1606 births
1671 deaths
University of Poitiers alumni
People from Vienne
University of Paris alumni
Bishops of Rodez
Archbishops of Paris
Members of the Académie Française
17th-century Roman Catholic archbishops in France
French male non-fiction writers